Bounpheng Mounphosay (born 1 September 1948) was a Laotian politician and member of the Lao People's Revolutionary Party. She was born in Xiangkhouang Province. 

In 1990 she was appointed Governor of Xiang Khuang province, making her the first female to hold a governship in Laotian history.

She was elected to the LPRP Central Committee at the 5th National Congress and retained a seat on the body until the 10th National Congress.

References

Specific

Bibliography
Books:
 

Living people
1948 births
Alternate members of the 5th Central Committee of the Lao People's Revolutionary Party
Members of the 6th Central Committee of the Lao People's Revolutionary Party
Members of the 7th Central Committee of the Lao People's Revolutionary Party
Members of the 8th Central Committee of the Lao People's Revolutionary Party
Members of the 9th Central Committee of the Lao People's Revolutionary Party
Governors of Xiangkhouang
Government ministers of Laos
Lao People's Revolutionary Party politicians
Place of birth missing (living people)
People from Xiangkhouang province